Hari Prasad Phuyal (हरि प्रसाद फुयाल) is the Justice of the Supreme Court of Nepal since April 19, 2019.

Education 
He has obtained a Masters of Laws (LL.M) degree in International Human Rights Law from the University of Essex the UK, with specialization on International Human Rights Laws, Laws of Armed Conflict, International Criminal Law, International Refugee Law and Laws of Peacekeeping Operations, and a Master of Laws (LL.M) degree in Business Laws from National Law School of India University (NLSIU), Bangalore, India in 1995, similarly Bachelor of Law (B. L.), from Nepal Law Campus, T.U., Kathmandu, Nepal, in 1992, and Intermediate in Law, (I.L), From Mahendra Multiple Campus, Tribhuvan University, Nepal.

Career

Justice 
He is appointed as a Justice of Supreme Court of Nepal  on April 19, 2019 as per article 129 of the Constitution of Nepal, 2015.

Attorney General
He worked as a Attorney General at Office of the Attorney General of Nepal, from April 18, 2016 to August 3 , 2016.

Lawyer 
He was a practicing lawyer since past 23 years based in Pacific Law Associates dealing with verities of legal issues including corporate matters and commercial cases to the courts. Involved in litigation on constitutional and human rights issues to the Supreme Court. He was also involved in various national and International organizations on constitutional and operational legal aspects. He played lead roles in some important cases establishing jurisprudence decided by the Supreme Court of Nepal.

Legal Adviser 
He worked as the National Legal Adviser at the UN Office of the High Commissioner for Human Rights (OHCHR) in Nepal since November 2005 to December 2006 with main responsibilities of analyzing constitutional provisions, national legislation with specific reference to security legislation and law applicable to the institutions of the criminal justice system of Nepal and to provide operational advice to the Office on the issues involving human rights and international humanitarian law.

Lecturer 
He taught the courses on Jurisprudence, Human Rights, and Banking Laws to students of Bachelor of Law (B.L) at the Nepal Law Campus of Tribhuban University, Nepal from 1995 to 2000.

Host TV talk show 
He hosted a prime time talk show Naya Sambidhan (New Constitution) on Kantipur Television (KTV). This talk show focused on contentious constitutional issues such as Citizenship, Federalism, the Electoral System, the Judicial System, Forms of Government and on the Constituent Assembly process related to drafting new constitution of Nepal. This talk show was broadcast between 18 September and 18 December 2014.

Author 
Book
 Book on Refugee Law published by Pairavi Publication, Nepal, in 1996 as a course book to LL.B. second year's student of Trivhuvan University.
 Book on Police and Human Rights published by INSEC, in 1997. 
 An article on relation between international and law municipal law: "Appraisal of Nepalese context", published in the Law Journal of Patan Appellate Court Bar Association of Nepal, 2001.

Personal life 
 Name: Hari Prasad Phuyal
 Date of Birth: 6th October 1970
 Married to Anju Upreti
 Has two children

Reference 

Justices of the Supreme Court of Nepal
1970 births 
Living people